Stephen David Lake (born 17 December 1963) is an Anglican clergyman and author who has been Bishop of Salisbury since April 2022; he was previously Dean of Gloucester from June 2011.

After a curacy at Sherborne Abbey he was priest in charge at St Aldhelm, Branksome then Rural Dean of Poole. He was a Canon Residentiary and Sub-Dean at St Albans Cathedral from 2001 until June 2011, when he became Dean of Gloucester. He was confirmed as Bishop of Salisbury in April 2022.

Early life and education 
Lake was born on 17 December 1963 in Poole, Dorset, England. After serving as a Community Service Volunteer he attended Chichester Theological College and was ordained in 1988 as deacon and 1989 as priest.

In 2011, he studied part time at King's College London, receiving a Master of Arts in Theology, Politics and Faith-Based Organisations. In 2016, he was made an Honorary Fellow for services to the City of Gloucester and the University by the University of Gloucestershire.

Ordained ministry 
Lake was ordained at Salisbury Cathedral and served his curacy at Sherborne Abbey. In 1992, he became vicar of Branksome St Aldhelm's Church, becoming Assistant Rural Dean of Poole in 1996 and Rural Dean of Poole in 2000.

In 2001, Lake became Sub-Dean and Canon Residentiary of St Albans Cathedral and was acting Dean between 2003 and 2004. From 2003 to 2011, he was a member of the General Synod.

In 2011, he became Dean of Gloucester; he was instituted at Gloucester Cathedral on 12 June. He was a Church Commissioner, acting Chair of the Bishoprics and Cathedrals Committee, and a member of the Church of England Emerging Church Steering Group. He was also lead Dean for safeguarding.

In Gloucester, his particular interests were the delivery of Project Pilgrim, the £10m development project for the Cathedral; and his role as Chair of the Regeneration Advisory Board for the City of Gloucester, which became the City Centre Commission in 2021.

In January 2022 it was announced that he had been appointed Bishop of Salisbury, to take office "after Easter" 2022. His election was confirmed on 1 April 2022 (at which point he legally became Bishop of Salisbury); he was consecrated as a bishop on 25 April 2022 by Justin Welby, Archbishop of Canterbury, at Southwark Cathedral.

Personal life 
Lake has been a member of the Scout Association since he was a Cub Scout and is currently Chair of Gloucestershire Scouts and Vice President of Dorset Scouts, having been a National Trustee from 2007 to 2012.

He is married to Carol and they have three children. He is an avid Tottenham Hotspur fan and hillwalker.

Published books 
 Confirmation Prayer Book,  (2002)
 Welcoming Marriage: A Practical and Pastoral Guide to the New Legislation,  (2009)
 Let the Children Come to Communion,  (2006)

References
 

1963 births
Alumni of the University of Southampton
Alumni of Chichester Theological College
Deans of Gloucester
Bishops of Salisbury
Living people
People from Poole